John C. Butt (born September 24, 1941) is a former politician in Newfoundland. He represented Conception Bay South in the Newfoundland House of Assembly from 1979 to 1989.

Butt was born in Pouch Cove. He served on the town council for Conception Bay South. He was elected to the Newfoundland assembly in 1979 and served in the provincial cabinet as Minister of Environment and Lands and as Minister of Culture, Recreation and Youth. Butt was defeated by Pat Cowan when he ran for reelection in 1989.

References 

1941 births
Living people
Progressive Conservative Party of Newfoundland and Labrador MHAs
Members of the Executive Council of Newfoundland and Labrador